David Locke Webster (November 6, 1888 – December 17, 1976) was an American physicist and physics professor, whose early research on X-rays and Parson's magneton influenced Arthur Compton.

Biography

David Locke Webster was born November 6, 1888 in Boston, Massachusetts to Andrew Gerrish Webster and Elizabeth Florence Briggs. He attended Harvard University, earning an A.B. in 1910 and a Ph.D. in physics in 1913.  His teaching career began at Harvard as a mathematics instructor, 1910–1911; physics assistant, 1911–15; and physics instructor, 1915–1917, during which time he published several papers on X-ray theory.  This work continued while served as a physics instructor at the nearby Massachusetts Institute of Technology from 1919 to 1920.  He acted a professor of physics at Stanford University from 1920 until his retirement in 1954, when he was awarded Professor Emeritus status. Webster was a member of the National Academy of Sciences, the American Academy of Arts and Sciences, the American Philosophical Society, the American Physical Society and the American Geophysical Union.  A member of the American Association of Physics Teachers from its inception in 1930, Webster served as its Vice-President in 1933 and 1934 and as President in 1935 and 1936.  During World War II, Webster served as head physicist in the United States Army Signal Corps (1942), chief physicist in the Ordnance Department (1942–45), and consultant to these units after 1945. Webster died December 17, 1976.

Bibliography

Books
 David L. Webster, General Physics for Colleges (Century, 1923).

Scientific papers

 David L. Webster, "The Scattering of Alpha Rays as Evidence on the Parson Magnetron Hypothesis", Physical Review (Feb 1918).

 David L. Webster, "The Physics of Flight", (May 1920).

 David L. Webster, "The Present Conception of Atomic Structure", (Jul 1921).
 David L. Webster, "A General Survey of the Present Status of the Atomic Structure Problem", (Jul 1921).
 David L. Webster, "Note on the Masses of Stars", (Jan 1922).

 David L. Webster, "Forces on Ferromagnets through which Electrons are Moving", (Dec 1946).

References

External links

20th-century American physicists
Particle physicists
Harvard College alumni
Harvard University faculty
Massachusetts Institute of Technology School of Science faculty
Stanford University Department of Physics faculty
People from Boston
1888 births
1976 deaths
Theoretical physicists
Members of the United States National Academy of Sciences
Harvard Graduate School of Arts and Sciences alumni